= Yoshiteru Nishi =

Japanese Chef

Yoshiteru Nishi (Japanese: 西芳照; born 23 January 1962) is a Japanese chef.

== Career ==
In 2004, Nishi was appointed chef of the Japan national football team.
